Cyathaspidida is a taxon of extinct cyathaspidiform heterostracan agnathans whose fossils are found in Silurian to Lower Devonian marine strata of Europe and North America.  In life, they are thought to be benthic animals that lived most of their lives either mostly buried in or resting directly on top of the substrate.

Taxonomy
The cyathaspidids of Cyathaspidida were tadpole-like animals with drum-shaped, cigar-shaped or wedge-shaped cephalothoraxes, and were anatomically similar to several other heterostracan groups.  However, with some groups, such as the traquairaspids, cardiopeltids, and corvaspidids, this similarity appears to be superficial.  With other groups, namely the tolypelepidids, the similarity suggests a close relationship.  The type genus of the tolypelepidids, Tolypelepis, in particular, was determined to be the sister-taxon of Cyathaspidida.  Originally, the cyathaspidid genera were organized together within the family Cyathaspididae.  Later, the genera were then organized into subfamilies, and these subfamilies would eventually be promoted to full familial status, including Irregularaspididae, Anglaspididae, Poraspididae, Ctenaspididae, etc.  In 2013, Lundgren and Blom reassessed several specimens of cyathaspidids, and reorganized them into three families, Cyathaspidae, Ariaspidae and Ctenaspidae.

Cyathaspidae
Cyathaspidae contains most of the genera originally contained within Cyathaspididae, as well as those genera contained within Irregularaspididae, and Poraspididae.  In addition to the type genus, Cyathaspis, Cyathaspidae contains the following genera: Americaspis, Archegonaspis, Capitaspis, Dikenaspis, Dinaspidella, Homaspidella, Irregulareaspis, Nahanniaspis, Pionaspis, Poraspis, Ptomaspis, Seretaspis, Steinaspis, Torpedaspis, and Veronaspis.

Ariaspidae
Family Ariaspidae contains Ariaspis, and its sister-taxa originally contained within Anglaspididae/Anglaspidinae, including Anglaspis, Listraspis, Liliaspis, and Paraliliaspis.

Ctenaspidae
If Amphiaspidida can be ignored as a daughter-taxon, the family Ctenaspidae contains Ctenaspis and its various sister-taxa originally contained within both Ctenaspididae and Ctenaspididae, including Allocryptaspis, Alainaspis, Zaphoctenaspis, Arctictenaspis, and Boothiaspis, which was first described as a "Canadian amphiaspid."

References

 
Devonian jawless fish
Silurian jawless fish
Devonian fish of Europe
Silurian fish of Europe
Devonian fish of North America
Silurian fish of North America
Cyathaspidiformes
Devonian first appearances
Silurian extinctions